Sadeqabad (also Romanized as Şādeqābād) is a village in Cham Rud Rural District, Bagh-e Bahadoran District, Lenjan County, Isfahan Province, Iran. At the 2006 census, its population was 266, in 77 families.

References 

Populated places in Lenjan County